This list of fairytale fantasies contains an illustrative list of fairytale fantasy works.

Original Fairytale Works

Friedrich de la Motte Fouqué's Undine (1811)
E. T. A. Hoffmann's The Nutcracker and the Mouseking (1816)
George MacDonald's Phantastes (1858)
Lewis Carroll's Alice's Adventures in Wonderland (1865)
Lewis Carroll's Through the Looking-Glass (1871)
George MacDonald's At the Back of the North Wind (1871)
George MacDonald's The Princess and the Goblin (1872)
Carlo Collodi's The Adventures of Pinocchio (1883)
L. Frank Baum's The Wonderful Wizard of Oz (1900)
J. M. Barrie's Peter Pan (1904: play) (1911: novel)
Lord Dunsany's The King of Elfland's Daughter (1924)
Lord Dunsany's The Charwoman's Shadow (1926)
James Thurber's Many Moons (1944)
James Thurber's The 13 Clocks (1950)
Jay Williams's The Practical Princess and other Liberating Fairy Tales (1979)
M. M. Kaye's The Ordinary Princess (1980)
Judy Corbalis's The Wrestling Princess and other stories (1986)
Susan Price's The Ghost Drum (1987)
Neil Gaiman's Stardust (1999)
Clare B. Dunkle's The Hollow Kingdom (2003)

Retellings

Beauty and the Beast
 Robin McKinley's Beauty: A Retelling of the Story of Beauty and the Beast (1978)
 Angela Carter's "The Courtship of Mr Lyon" and "The Tiger's Bride" in The Bloody Chamber (1979)
 Robin McKinley's Rose Daughter (1997)
 Donna Jo Napoli's Beast (2000)
 Alex Flinn's Beastly (2007)
 Cameron Dokey's Belle (2008)
 Juliet Marillier's Heart's Blood (2009)
 Rosamund Hodge's Cruel Beauty (2014)
 Naomi Novik's Uprooted (2015)
 Sarah J. Maas's A Court of Thorns and Roses (2015)
 Brigid Kemmerer's A Curse So Dark and Lonely (2019)

Rapunzel
 Nicholas Stuart Gray's The Stone Cage (1963)
 Adele Geras's The Tower Room (1990) (book 1 in the Egerton Hall Trilogy)
 Donna Jo Napoli's Zel (1996)
 Cameron Dokey's Golden (2006)
 Kate Forsyth's Bitter Greens (2012)

The Little Mermaid
 Osamu Tezuka's Angel's Hill (1960)
 Rosa Guy's My Love, My Love, or the Peasant Girl (1985)
 Alice Hoffman's Aquamarine (2001)
 Debbie Viguié's Midnight Pearls (2003)
 Jim C. Hines's The Mermaid's Madness (2009)
 LeAnn Neal Reilly's The Mermaid's Pendant (2010)
 Carolyn Turgeon's Mermaid: A Twist on the Classic Tale (2011)
 Jackson Pearce's Fathomless (2012)
 L.A. Witt's Ripples and Waves: A Queer Retelling of Hans Christian Andersen's The Little Mermaid (2019)
 Natasha Bowen's Skin of the Sea (2021)

Sleeping Beauty

 Anne Rice’s The Sleeping Beauty Quartet  (1983-2015) 

 Adele Geras's Watching the Roses (1991) (book 2 in the Egerton Hall Trilogy)
 Jane Yolen's Briar Rose (1992)
 Martha Wells' "Thorns" (Realms of Fantasy, 1995)
 Robert Coover's Briar Rose (1996)
 Orson Scott Card's Enchantment (1999)
 Sophie Masson's Clementine (1999)
 Robin McKinley's Spindle's End (2000)

Rumpelstiltskin
 Eleanor Farjeon's The Silver Curlew (play, 1949; novel, 1953) 
 Elizabeth C. Bunce's A Curse Dark as Gold (2008)

The Wild Swans
 Nicholas Stuart Gray's The Seventh Swan (1962), about the brother left with a swan's wing for an arm
 Peg Kerr's The Wild Swans (1999)
 Juliet Marillier's Daughter of the Forest (2000)

Snow White
 Adele Geras's Pictures of the Night (1992) (book 3 in the Egerton Hall Trilogy)
 Tanith Lee's White as Snow, a dark retelling (2000)
 Gregory Maguire's Mirror, Mirror (2003)
 Gail Carson Levine's Fairest (2006)
 Jane Yolen's Snow in Summer: Fairest of Them All, a retelling set in early twentieth-century Appalachia (2011)

Pied Piper of Hamelin
 Delia Huddy's Time Piper (1984)
 Jane Lindskold's The Pipes of Orpheus (1995)
 Terry Pratchett's The Amazing Maurice and his Educated Rodents (2001)
 Adam McCune & Keith McCune's The Rats of Hamelin (2005)
 Meg Harper's Piper (2007)

Cinderella
 Eleanor Farjeon's The Glass Slipper (play, 1944; novelization, 1955)
 Gail Carson Levine's Ella Enchanted (1997)
 Gregory Maguire's Confessions of an Ugly Stepsister (1999)
 Margaret Peterson Haddix's Just Ella (1999)
 Diane Stanley's Bella at Midnight (2006)

The Twelve Dancing Princesses
 Juliet Marillier's Wildwood Dancing (2008) also based on The Frog Prince
 Suzanne Weyn's The Night Dance (2008) 
 Jessica Day George's Princess of the Midnight Ball (2009) 
 Heather Dixon's Entwined (2011)

Other tales
Katharine Mary Briggs's Kate Crackernuts (1963) based on the Scottish fairy tale Kate Crackernuts
James Reeves's The Cold Flame (1967), a retelling of the Grimm tale The Blue Light
Joan Vinge's The Snow Queen (1980)  using elements of the Hans Christian Andersen fairy tale
Kara Dalkey's The Nightingale (1988), based on "The Emperor and the Nightingale"
Patricia Wrede's Snow White and Rose Red (1989) based on the Grimm Brothers' tale of the same title, which is not Snow White
Ellen Kushner's Thomas the Rhymer (1990) based on the Scottish ballad of the same title
Robin McKinley's Deerskin (1994) a retelling of Charles Perrault's Donkeyskin
 Gregory Maguire's Wicked: The Life and Times of the Wicked Witch of the West (1995) a parallel novel of The Wizard of Oz based upon the writings of L. Frank Baum
Sophie Masson's Carabas (US title Serafin) (1996) based on Puss in Boots
 Gregory Frost's Fitcher's Brides (2002) a retelling of the Bluebeard / Fitcher's Bird fairy tale
 Louise Murphy's The True Story of Hansel and Gretel (2003)
 Edith Pattou's East (2003) based on East of the Sun and West of the Moon
Shannon Hale's The Goose Girl (2003) based on The Goose Girl tale collected by the Grimm Brothers
 Kathryn Davis's The Girl Who Trod on a Loaf (2003) a contemporary American treatment of the Hans Andersen story
 Jackson Pearce's Sisters Red (2010), based on Little Red Riding Hood; Sweetly (2011), based on Hansel and Gretel; and Fathomless (2012), a retelling of The Little Mermaid.
 Jessica Day George's Sun and Moon, Ice and Snow (2011), based on East of the Sun and West of the Moon

Multiple
 Angela Carter's The Bloody Chamber (1979) (stories)
 Robin McKinley's The Door in the Hedge (1981)
 Tanith Lee's Red as Blood, or Tales from the Sisters Grimmer (1983) a collection of short stories, all fairytale fantasies, many of them revisionist
 Francesca Lia Block's The Rose and the Beast (1993) (stories)
 Emma Donoghue's Kissing the Witch (1993) (stories)
 Ellen Datlow and Terri Windling's Snow White, Blood Red (1993), Black Thorn, White Rose (1994), and Ruby Slippers, Golden Tears (1995)
 Berlie Doherty's The Vinegar Jar (1994) draws on several tales from Grimm
 Cornelia Funke's Reckless (2010) draws on several of Grimm's Fairy Tales
 Katie Farris's boysgirls'' (2011), short stories which include retellings

See also
 List of fairy tales, linking to various individual fairy tales' pages, several of which list fairytale fantasies among their variants
 Once Upon a Time, a series of novels by various authors, mainly new retellings of fairy tales

Fairytale Fantasies